Alpagut or Alpağut may refer:

Places in Turkey
 Alpagut, Dodurga
 Alpagut, Elâzığ
 Alpagut, Ilgaz
 Alpagut, Kazan, a village in the district of Kazan, Ankara Province
 Alpağut, Keles
 Alpagut, Kızılcahamam, a village in the district of Kızılcahamam, Ankara Province
 Alpagut, Lapseki
 Alpağut, Nallıhan, a village in the district of Nallıhan, Ankara Province
 Alpağut, Bilecik, a village in the district of Bilecik, Bilecik Province
 Alpagut, Mudurnu, a village in the district of Mudurnu, Bolu Province
 Alpagut, Mustafakemalpaşa
 Alpagut, Mihalgazi, a small town in Mihalgazi district of Eskişehir Province
 Alpagut, Seben
 Alpağut, Kastamonu, a village in the district of Kastamonu, Kastamonu Province

People with the surname
 Alp Alpagut, (born 1974), Turkish Olympic sailor